Hendrik Basson (born 26 March 1952) is a South African cricketer. He played in one List A and six first-class matches for Boland from 1980 to 1988.

See also
 List of Boland representative cricketers

References

External links
 

1952 births
Living people
South African cricketers
Boland cricketers
Cricketers from Paarl